Thryptomene salina is a shrub species in the family Myrtaceae that is endemic to Western Australia.

The shrub is found in a small area the Wheatbelt region of Western Australia around Kondinin.

References

salina
Endemic flora of Western Australia
Critically endangered flora of Australia
Rosids of Western Australia
Plants described in 2001
Taxa named by Barbara Lynette Rye
Taxa named by Malcolm Eric Trudgen